Below is a partial list of minor league baseball players in the Tampa Bay Rays system:

Players

Mason Auer

Mason Bradley Auer (born March 1, 2001) is an American professional baseball outfielder in the Tampa Bay Rays organization.

Auer attended Kickapoo High School in Springfield, Missouri. He was drafted by the Chicago Cubs in the 39th round of the 2019 Major League Baseball draft but did not sign and played college baseball at Missouri State University. After one year at Missouri State, he transferred to San Jacinto College. He was then drafted by the Tampa Bay Rays in the fifth round of the 2021 MLB draft.

Auer made his professional debut with the Florida Complex League Rays. He started 2022 with the Charleston RiverDogs before being promoted to the Bowling Green Hot Rods.

Osleivis Basabe

Osleivis José Basabe (born September 13, 2000) is a Venezuelan professional baseball infielder in the Tampa Bay Rays organization.

Basabe signed with the Texas Rangers as an international free agent in December 2017. He made his professional debut in 2018 with the Dominican Summer League Rays and played 2019 with the Arizona League Rangers and Spokane Indians.

On December 10, 2020, the Rangers traded Basabe, Heriberto Hernandez and Alexander Ovalles to the Tampa Bay Rays for Nathaniel Lowe, Jake Guenther and Carl Chester. He spent his first season in the Rays organization playing with the Charleston RiverDogs and Bowling Green Hot Rods. He played 2022 with Bowling Green and the Montgomery Biscuits.

Basabe was optioned to the Triple-A Durham Bulls to begin the 2023 season.

Taj Bradley

Taj Ali Bradley (born March 20, 2001) is an American professional baseball pitcher in the Tampa Bay Rays organization.

Bradley grew up in Stone Mountain, Georgia and attended Redan High School. He initially played mostly outfield and catcher before. Bradley initially committed to play college baseball at Hillsborough Community College before changing his commitment to the University of South Carolina later in his senior year.

Bradley was selected in the fifth round of the 2018 Major League Baseball draft by the Tampa Bay Rays. He made his professional debut with the Rookie-level Gulf Coast League Rays with whom he pitched 23 innings and compiled a 5.09 ERA. He spent the 2019 season with the Rookie-level Princeton Rays of the Appalachian League where he went 2–5 with 3.18 over 11 starts and 12 total appearances. Bradley began the 2021 season with the Low-A East Charleston RiverDogs where he went 9–3 with a 1.76 ERA over 14 starts before being promoted to the High-A East Bowling Green Hot Rods. Over eight starts with Bowling Green, he went 3–0 with a 1.96 ERA and 42 strikeouts over  innings. Bradley was assigned to the Double-A Montgomery Biscuits at the start of the 2022 season. He was selected to play in the 2022 All-Star Futures Game. Bradley was promoted to the Triple-A Durham Bulls following the conclusion of the MLB All-Star break.

Bradley was optioned to Triple-A Durham to begin the 2023 season.

Braden Bristo

Braden James Bristo (born November 1, 1994) is an American professional baseball pitcher in the Tampa Bay Rays organization.

Bristo attended Ouachita Christian High School in Monroe, Louisiana and played college baseball at Louisiana Tech University. He was drafted by the New York Yankees in the twenty-third round of the 2016 Major League Baseball draft.
Bristo spent his first professional season with the Pulaski Yankees in 2016. He pitched 2017 with the Charleston RiverDogs and the Staten Island Yankees. He spent 2018 between Charleston and the Tampa Tarpons and 2019 with Tampa and the Trenton Thunder. He did not play a minor league game in 2020 since the season was cancelled due to the COVID-19 pandemic. He started 2021 with the Scranton/Wilkes-Barre RailRiders. On November 10, 2022, Bristo elected free agency.

On December 21, 2022, Bristo signed a minor league deal with the Rays.

Junior Caminero

Junior Alberto Caminero (born July 5, 2003) is an Dominican professional baseball shortstop in the Tampa Bay Rays organization.

Caminero was signed by the Cleveland Indians in 2019. His first minor league season was canceled due to Covid-19. Caminero made his professional career with the Rookie-level Dominican Summer League Indians and batted .295 with .295 with nine home runs and 33 RBIs.

Caminero was traded on November 19, 2021, to the Tampa Bay Rays on in exchange for pitcher Tobias Myers. He began the 2022 season with the Florida Complex League Rays. Caminero was later promoted to the Charleston RiverDogs of the Single-A Carolina League and batted .314 with 11 home runs and 51 RBIs in 62 games between the two teams. After the season, he played for the Perth Heat of the Australian Baseball League.

Ruben Cardenas

Ruben Cardenas (born October 10, 1997) is an American professional baseball outfielder in the Tampa Bay Rays organization.

Cardenas attended Saugus High School in Santa Clarita, California before transferring to Bishop Alemany High School in Mission Hills, California as a junior. He batted .400 as a sophomore and .412 as a junior. He was selected by the Miami Marlins in the 37th round of the 2015 Major League Baseball draft, but did not sign. He originally signed a letter of intent to play college baseball at the University of Nevada, Reno, but instead attended California State University, Fullerton.

As a freshman at Cal State Fullerton in 2016, Cardenas appeared in 44 games, batting .233 with three home runs and 28 RBIs, and played in only 16 games in 2017 due to a back injury. In 2018, his junior year, he hit .292/.355/.432 with four home runs, 38 RBIs, and 12 stolen bases over sixty games. Following the season's end, he was selected by the Cleveland Indians in the 16th round of the 2018 Major League Baseball draft.

Cardenas signed with the Indians and made his professional debut with the Rookie-level Arizona League Indians before being assigned to the Mahoning Valley Scrappers of the Class A Short Season New York–Penn League, batting .308 over 42 games with both clubs. He began the 2019 season with the Lake County Captains of the Class A Midwest League.

On July 28, 2019, Cardenas and international signing period slot money were traded to the Tampa Bay Rays in exchange for Christian Arroyo and Hunter Wood. He was the assigned to the Bowling Green Hot Rods of the Class A Midwest League. Over 114 games between Lake County and Bowling Green, he slashed .271/.338/.450 with 13 home runs and seventy RBIs. He returned to Bowling Green, now members of the High-A East, to begin the 2021 season before he was promoted to the Montgomery Biscuits of the Double-A South in mid-June. He was named the Double-A South Player of the Month for July after batting .340 with eight home runs and 22 RBIs with 11 multi-hit games. Over 105 games for the 2021 season between Bowling Green and Montgomery, Cardenas slashed .292/.333/.523 with 25 home runs and 78 RBIs. He was assigned to the Durham Bulls of the Triple-A International League for the 2022 season. Over 82 games with Durham, he batted .208 with 16 home runs and 41 RBIs.

Ryan Cermak

Ryan Cermak (born June 2, 2001) is an American professional baseball outfielder in the Tampa Bay Rays organization. He played college baseball for the Illinois State Redbirds.

Cermak grew up in Riverside, Illinois and attended Riverside Brookfield High School, where he played baseball and basketball.

Cermak played college baseball at Illinois State for three seasons. He slashed .208/.296/.396 with three doubles, two home runs, and seven RBIs in 13 games during his true freshman season before it was cut short due to the coronavirus pandemic. Cermak was named first-team Missouri Valley Conference (MVC) after batting .284 with 11 home runs and 40 RBIs. As a junior, he repeated as a first-team All-MVC selection after hitting .340 with 19 home runs.

Cermak was selected in the Competitive Balance section of the second round of the 2022 Major League Baseball draft. He signed with the Rays on July 21, 2022, and received a $750,000 signing bonus. Cermak was assigned to the Florida Complex League Rays after signing and batted .273 with two home runs and five RBIs in seven games.

Illinois State Redbirds bio

John Doxakis

John West Doxakis (born August 20, 1998) is an American professional baseball pitcher in the Tampa Bay Rays organization.

Doxakis attended Lamar High School in Houston, Texas, and played college baseball at Texas A&M University. In 2018, he played for the USA Baseball Collegiate National Team. As a junior at Texas A&M in 2019, he pitched  innings and went 7–4 with a 2.06 ERA and 115 strikeouts. He was selected by the Tampa Bay Rays in the second round with the 61st overall selection of the 2019 Major League Baseball draft. He signed for $1.13 million.

Doxakis made his professional debut with the Hudson Valley Renegades and appeared in 12 games, posting a 1.93 ERA with 31 strikeouts over  innings. He split the 2021 season between the Charleston RiverDogs and Bowling Green Hot Rods with whom he started 21 games and went 9–2 with a 3.94 ERA and 114 strikeouts over  innings. He returned to Bowling Green to open the 2022 season and was promoted to the Montgomery Biscuits in late May. Over 27 games (25 starts) between the two teams, he went 4-8 with a 4.89 ERA and 113 strikeouts over 116 innings.

Texas A&M Aggies bio

Tyler Frank

Tyler Joseph Frank (born January 15, 1997) is an American professional baseball shortstop in the Tampa Bay Rays organization.

Frank graduated from American Heritage School in Delray Beach, Florida. As a senior in 2015, he batted .448 and was named to the Class 4A All-State Team. He was not drafted out of high school in the 2015 Major League Baseball draft and he enrolled at Florida Atlantic University to play college baseball for the Owls.

As a freshman at FAU in 2016, Frank batted .285 with one home run, 27 RBIs, and a .401 on-base percentage in 45 games, earning him a spot on the Conference USA All-Freshman Team. In 2017, as a sophomore, Frank started all 57 of FAU's games and batted .336 with 11 home runs, 43 RBIs, and 41 walks. He was named to the All-Conference USA First Team. That summer, he played for USA Baseball's Collegiate National Team, making him the first ever FAU player to be named to the team. He also played in the Cape Cod Baseball League for the Hyannis Harbor Hawks. In 2018, his junior year, Frank hit .300 with 13 home runs and 35 RBIs in 63 games and was once again named to the All-Conference USA First Team along with being named the Conference USA Defensive Player of the Year.

After his junior year, Frank was selected in the second round (56th overall) by the Tampa Bay Rays in the 2018 Major League Baseball draft and he signed for $997,500. He made his professional debut for the Hudson Valley Renegades of the Class A Short Season New York-Penn League, with whom he was named an All-Star, and spent the whole season there, slashing .288/.425/.412 with two home runs and 22 RBIs in 51 games. Frank began 2019 with the Charlotte Stone Crabs of the Class A-Advanced Florida State League but appeared in only 16 games due to an arm injury. He did not play a minor league game in 2020 since the season was cancelled due to the COVID-19 pandemic, and missed all of the 2021 season due to a shoulder injury. He missed the beginning of the 2022 season, but returned to play in mid-May with the Montgomery Biscuits of the Double-A Southern League after missing nearly three full seasons due to shoulder surgeries and switching from a right-handed batter to left-handed. He was demoted to the Bowling Green Hot Rods of the High-A South Atlantic League in early August but was later assigned back to Montgomery. Over 67 games between the two teams, he hit .216 with two home runs and 26 RBIs.

J.J. Goss

Jamey Russell Goss (born December 25, 2000) is an American professional baseball pitcher in the Tampa Bay Rays organization.

Goss attended Cypress Ranch High School in Cypress, Texas. In 2019, his senior year, he went 11–2 with a 0.64 ERA. He had committed to play college baseball at Texas A&M University.  Goss was a key contributor in the 2019 Perfect Game All American Classic, pitching a 1-2-3 top of the fifth, helping the West squad secure a 4–2 victory.

Considered one of the top prospects for the 2019 Major League Baseball draft, Goss was selected by the Tampa Bay Rays with the 36th overall pick in the Competitive Balance Round A. He signed for $2.05 million and made his professional debut with the Gulf Coast Rays. Over nine games (eight starts), he went 1–3 with a 5.82 ERA, striking out 16 over 17 innings. He did not play a minor league game in 2020 since the season was cancelled due to the COVID-19 pandemic. Goss returned to the Gulf Coast Rays in 2021, pitching a total of  innings while recovering from a shoulder injury. He was assigned to the Charleston RiverDogs for the 2022 season. Over 25 starts, he went 4-5 with a 4.00 ERA and 101 strikeouts over  innings.

Tristan Gray

Tristan Colby Gray (born March 22, 1996) is an American professional baseball second baseman in the Tampa Bay Rays organization.

Gray graduated from Elkins High School in Missouri City, Texas in 2014. As a senior, he batted .456 with 12 doubles and 23 RBIs. He was selected by the New York Mets in the 37th round of the 2014 MLB draft, but did not sign and instead chose to enroll at Rice University where he played college baseball for the Rice Owls.

In 2015, as a freshman at Rice, Gray appeared in 56 games, batting .247 with three home runs and 25 RBIs. As a sophomore in 2016, he missed time at the beginning of the year due to injury, but returned to slash .295/.353/.462 with five home runs and 18 RBIs in 42 games. After the 2015 and 2016 seasons, he played collegiate summer baseball in the Cape Cod Baseball League for the Falmouth Commodores, and was named a league all-star in 2016. Gray broke out as a junior in 2017, hitting .313/.399/.540 with eight home runs and 39 RBIs in 47 games. After his junior year, he was drafted by the Pittsburgh Pirates in the 13th round of the 2017 MLB draft. He signed and made his professional debut for the West Virginia Black Bears of the Class A Short Season New York-Penn League, where he was named an All-Star. He finished the season batting .269 with seven home runs and 37 RBIs in 53 games.

On February 22, 2018, the Pirates traded Gray, Daniel Hudson, and cash to the Tampa Bay Rays in exchange for Corey Dickerson. He spent the 2018 season with the Charlotte Stone Crabs of the Class A-Advanced Florida State League, compiling a .238 batting average, 13 home runs, and 69 RBIs in 118 games. He spent 2019 with the Montgomery Biscuits of the Class AA Southern League, slashing .225/.332/.409 with 17 home runs and 64 RBIs over 122 games. He did not play a minor league game in 2020 since the season was cancelled due to the COVID-19 pandemic. For the 2021 season, he was assigned to the Durham Bulls of the Triple-A East, slashing .246/.318/.428 with eight home runs and 33 RBIs over 75 games. He returned to Durham for the 2022 season. Over 124 games, he batted .225 with 33 home runs and 89 RBIs.

Blake Hunt

Blake Evan Hunt (born November 10, 1998) is an American professional baseball catcher for the Tampa Bay Rays organization.

Hunt attended Mater Dei High School in Santa Ana, California, where he batted .394 with six home runs, 28 RBIs, and nine doubles as a senior in 2017. He was selected by the San Diego Padres in the second round of the 2017 Major League Baseball draft. He signed for $1.6 million, forgoing his commitment to play college baseball for the Pepperdine Waves baseball team.

Hunt made his professional debut with the Arizona League Padres, batting .241 over thirty games. He spent the 2018 season with the Tri-City Dust Devils where he hit .271 with three home runs and 25 RBIs over 56 games, and he played 2019 with the Fort Wayne TinCaps, slashing .255/.331/.381 with five home runs and 39 RBIs over 89 games. He did not play a game in 2020 due to the cancellation of the minor league season.

On December 29, 2020, the Padres traded Hunt, Francisco Mejía, Luis Patiño, and Cole Wilcox to the Tampa Bay Rays for Blake Snell. He split the 2021 season between the Bowling Green Hot Rods and the Montgomery Biscuits, slashing .205/.288/.375 with nine home runs and 48 RBIs in 76 games.

Xavier Isaac

Xavier Francis Isaac is an American professional baseball first baseman for the Tampa Bay Rays.

Isaac graduated from East Forsyth High School in Kernersville, North Carolina. He was named an All-American in 2022. He committed to play college baseball at the University of Florida.

The Tampa Bay Rays selected Isaac in the first round, with the 29th overall selection, of the 2022 MLB draft. He signed with the Rays, receiving a $2.5 million signing bonus.

Kevin Kelly

Kevin Clayton Kelly (born November 28, 1997) is an American professional baseball pitcher in the Tampa Bay Rays organization.

Kelly grew up in Springfield, Virginia and attended Paul VI Catholic High School.

Kelly played college baseball for the James Madison Dukes for three seasons. He was named a freshman All-American by the Collegiate Baseball Newspaper after going 5–3 with a 2.91 ERA and 38 strikeouts in 34 innings pitched over 24 relief appearances. As a sophomore, Kelly posted a 3–3 record with a 3.74 ERA in 15 appearances with 11 starts. After the season, he played collegiate summer baseball for the Orleans Firebirds of the Cape Cod Baseball League. Kelly went 7–7 with a 3.26 ERA and 94 strikeouts over 15 starts.
 
Kelly was selected by the Cleveland Guardians in the 19th round of the 2019 Major League Baseball Draft. After signing with the team he was assigned to the Arizona League Indians and had a 2.08 ERA and struck out 25 batters in  innings pitched. After not playing in 2020 due to the cancellation of the minor league season caused by the COVID-19 pandemic, Kelly was assigned to the High-A Lake County Captains for the 2021 season. He began the 2022 season with the Double-A Akron RubberDucks.

On December 7, 2022, Kelly was selected by the Colorado Rockies in the 2022 Rule 5 draft and added to their 40-man roster. The same day, he was traded to the Tampa Bay Rays in exchange for cash considerations.

James Madison Dukes bio

Kyle Manzardo

Kyle Thomas Manzardo (born July 18, 2000) is an American baseball first baseman in the Tampa Bay Rays organization.

Manzardo grew up in Coeur d'Alene, Idaho, and attended Lake City High School, where he played baseball and basketball. As a senior, he batted .594 and was named the Inland Empire League MVP after batting .471 as a junior.

Manzardo played college baseball at Washington State for three seasons. He hit for a .272 average as a freshman and led the team with 31 RBIs. After the season, Manzardo played collegiate summer baseball for the Portland Pickles of the West Coast League. He hit .435 through 16 games as a sophomore before the season was cut short due to the coronavirus pandemic. During the summer, he played for the Willmar Stingers of the Northwoods League. As a junior, Manzardo batted .365 with 11 home runs and 60 RBIs and was named a first team All-American by Collegiate Baseball.

Manzardo was selected in the second round of the 2021 Major League Baseball draft by the Tampa Bay Rays. He signed and made his professional debut with the Rookie-level Florida Complex League Rays, slashing .349/.440/.605 with two home runs, eight RBIs, and five doubles over 13 games. Manzardo began the 2022 season with the High-A Bowling Green Hot Rods. He slashed .329/.436/.636 with 17 home runs in 63 games before being promoted to the Montgomery Biscuits of the Double-A Southern League.

Washington State Cougars bio

Curtis Mead

Curtis James Mead (born October 26, 2000) is an Australian baseball third baseman in the Tampa Bay Rays organization.

Mead was born and grew up in Adelaide, South Australia, Australia and attended Immanuel College, Adelaide. He began his professional baseball career at 16 with the Adelaide Giants of the Australian Baseball League, whom his father Tim had previously played for. Mead also played Australian rules football for the Woodville-West Torrens Football Club under-16 team until the club required him to choose between the two sports.

Mead was signed by the Philadelphia Phillies on May 4, 2018. After signing he was assigned to the Gulf Coast League Phillies. He returned to the GCL Phillies in 2019 and batted .285 with four home runs and 19 RBIs. After each season, Mead continued to play for the Adelaide Giants in the winter.
 
Mead was traded to the Tampa Bay Rays on November 20, 2019, in exchange for Cristopher Sánchez. After the 2020 minor league season was canceled, Mead returned to the Giants and was named the team's MVP after batting .347. Mead began the 2021 season with the Low-A Charleston RiverDogs, where he hit for a .358 average with seven home runs and 35 RBIs in 46 games before being promoted to the High-A Bowling Green Hot Rods. He batted .282 with seven home runs, 32 RBIs, and an .814 OPS in 53 games for Bowling Green and was promoted again to the Durham Bulls of Triple-A East for the final week of the season. After the season, Mead played for the Scottsdale Scorpions in the Arizona Fall League. He was assigned to the Double-A Montgomery Biscuits at the start of the 2022 season. Mead was promoted to Durham after batting .305 with 10 home runs and 36 RBIs in 56 games at Montgomery.

Mead was optioned to Triple-A Durham to begin the 2023 season.

Mason Montgomery

Mason Jack Montgomery (born June 17, 2000) is an American professional baseball pitcher in the Tampa Bay Rays organization.

Montgomery grew up in Leander, Texas and attended Leander High School. Montgomery was selected in the 39th round of the 2018 Major League Baseball draft by the Chicago White Sox, but opted not to sign with the team.

Montgomery played college baseball for the Texas Tech Red Raiders for three seasons. He went 5–3 with a 3.82 ERA and 84 strikeouts in  innings pitched over 14 outings as a junior.

Montgomery was selected in the sixth round of the 2021 Major League Baseball draft by the Tampa Bay Rays. After signing with the team he was assigned to the Rookie-level Florida Complex League Rays, where he allowed one earned run and struck out 20 batters in  innings pitched. Montgomery was assigned to the High-A Bowling Green Hot Rods to begin the 2022 season.

Texas Tech Red Raiders bio

Dillon Paulson

Dillon Paulson (born June 10, 1997) is an American professional baseball first baseman for the Tampa Bay Rays organization.

Paulson attended Santa Fe Christian School in Solana Beach, California, and the University of Southern California (USC), where he played college baseball for the USC Trojans. The Los Angeles Dodgers selected him in the 13th round of the 2018 MLB draft. On December 29, 2020, the Dodgers traded Paulson and a player to be named later to the Tampa Bay Rays as part of a three-team trade that sent José Alvarado to the Phillies and Garrett Cleavinger to the Dodgers.

Tristan Peters

Tristan Dimitri Peters (born February 29, 2000) is a Canadian professional baseball outfielder in the Tampa Bay Rays organization.

Peters played college baseball at Chandler-Gilbert Community College and Southern Illinois University. He was drafted by the Milwaukee Brewers in the seventh round of the 2021 Major League Baseball Draft.

Peters made his professional debut with the Arizona Complex League Brewers and started 2022 with the Wisconsin Timber Rattlers, for whom he batted .306/.386/.485 in 330 at bats with eight triples and seven home runs.

On August 2, 2022, the Brewers traded Peters to the San Francisco Giants for pitcher Trevor Rosenthal. Playing for AA Richmond, he batted .212/.302/.303 in 132 at bats.

On November 15, 2022, Peters was traded to the Tampa Bay Rays for infielder Brett Wisely.

Evan Reifert

Evan Matthew Reifert (born May 14, 1999) is an American professional baseball pitcher in the Tampa Bay Rays organization.

Reifert played college baseball at North Iowa Area Community College. He was drafted by the Texas Rangers in the 30th round of the 2018 MLB draft, but did not sign and returned to North Iowa. In 2020, he transferred to the University of Central Missouri. Reifert went undrafted after the 2020 MLB draft and signed with the Milwaukee Brewers.

Reifert sent his first professional season in 2021 with the Carolina Mudcats and Wisconsin Timber Rattlers. On November 13, 2021 the Brewers traded him to the Tampa Bay Rays for Mike Brosseau. Reifert spent the 2022 season with the Florida Complex League Rays, Charleston RiverDogs, Bowling Green Hot Rods and Montgomery Biscuits. After the season, he played in the Arizona Fall League.

Ian Seymour

Ian Albert Seymour (born December 13, 1998) is an American professional baseball pitcher in the Tampa Bay Rays organization.

Seymour attended Saint John's High School in Shrewsbury, Massachusetts. He went 4–0 with a 0.48 ERA as a senior in 2017. Following graduation, he enrolled at Virginia Tech where he played college baseball. As a freshman in 2018, he made appeared in 14 games (13 starts) in which he compiled a 4.17 ERA and seventy strikeouts over 69 innings. In 2019, he started 13 games, going 4–5 with a 3.97 ERA and 81 strikeouts. After the 2019 season, he played collegiate summer baseball with the Yarmouth–Dennis Red Sox of the Cape Cod Baseball League. He pitched only  innings in 2020 before the remainder of the season was cancelled due to the COVID-19 pandemic.

Seymour was selected by the Tampa Bay Rays in the second round with the 57th overall selection of the 2020 Major League Baseball draft. He signed for $1.2 million. He did not play a minor league game in 2020 due to the cancellation of the season caused by the pandemic. He began the 2021 season with the Charleston RiverDogs of the Low-A East and earned promotions to the Bowling Green Hot Rods of the High-A East and the Durham Bulls of the Triple-A East during the season. Over 14 games (13 starts) for the 2021 season, Seymour went 4–0 with a 1.95 ERA and 87 strikeouts over  innings. He was assigned to the Montgomery Biscuits of the Double-A Southern League to begin the 2022 season. He made five starts before undergoing Tommy John surgery, forcing him to miss the remainder of the season.

Austin Shenton

Austin P. Shenton (born January 22, 1998) is an American professional baseball third baseman in the Tampa Bay Rays organization.

Shenton attended Bellingham High School in Bellingham, Washington. He was drafted by the Cleveland Indians in the 34th round of the 2016 Major League Baseball draft but did not sign and played college baseball at Florida International University. In 2018, he played collegiate summer baseball with the Wareham Gatemen of the Cape Cod Baseball League, where he was named a league all-star and the playoff MVP of Wareham's league championship run.

Shenton was drafted by the Seattle Mariners in the fifth round of the 2019 Major League Baseball draft and signed. He started his career that year with the Everett AquaSox before being promoted to the West Virginia Power, batting .298 with seven home runs and 36 RBIs over 53 games between both teams. He did not play a minor league game in 2020 since the season was cancelled due to the COVID-19 pandemic. He spent the summer as a member of Seattle's 60-man player pool. Shenton started 2021 with Everett before being promoted to the Arkansas Travelers.

On July 29, 2021, Shenton and J. T. Chargois were traded to the Tampa Bay Rays in exchange for Diego Castillo. He was assigned to the Montgomery Biscuits where he finished the year. Over eighty games between Everett, Arkansas, and Montgomery he slashed .295/.398/.549 with 14 home runs and seventy RBIs.

Carlos Vargas

Carlos Jose Vargas Polanco (born March 18, 1999) is a Dominican professional baseball shortstop in the Tampa Bay Rays organization.

Vargas signed with the Seattle Mariners as an international free agent in July 2015. He made his professional debut in 2016 with the DSL Mariners and spent the whole season there, posting a .242 batting average with seven home runs and 35 RBIs in 62 games.

On January 11, 2017, Vargas was traded to the Tampa Bay Rays, along with Mallex Smith and Ryan Yarbrough, for Drew Smyly. The Rays assigned him to the GCL Rays where he spent the whole 2017 season, batting .245 with five home runs and 27 RBIs in 54 games. In 2018, he played for the Princeton Rays, slashing .256/.333/.413 with four home runs and 22 RBIs in 47 games. He did not play a minor league game in 2020 since the season was cancelled due to the COVID-19 pandemic.

Colby White

Colby Ashton White (born July 4, 1998) is an American professional baseball pitcher in the Tampa Bay Rays organization.

White graduated from West Marion High School in Foxworth, Mississippi in 2016, and then played two seasons of college baseball at Pearl River Community College. In 2018, he played collegiate summer baseball with the Cotuit Kettleers of the Cape Cod Baseball League. After his sophomore year at Pearl City, he transferred to Mississippi State University. In 2019, his only year at Mississippi State, he went 3–1 with a 3.12 ERA and 48 strikeouts over 26 innings. He was selected by the Tampa Bay Rays in the sixth round with the 188th overall pick in the 2019 Major League Baseball draft.

White signed with the Rays and made his professional debut with the Hudson Valley Renegades of the Class A Short Season New York–Penn League, going 1–0 with a 2.79 ERA over 15 relief appearances. He did not play a minor league game in 2020 due to the cancellation of the season caused by the COVID-19 pandemic. He began the 2021 season with the Charleston RiverDogs of the Low-A East and earned promotions to the Bowling Green Hot Rods of the High-A East, the Montgomery Biscuits of the Double-A South, and the Durham Bulls of the Triple-A East during the season. Over 43 appearances between the four clubs, White went 4–3 with a 1.44 ERA and 104 strikeouts over  innings. He was named Tampa Bay's Minor League Relief Pitcher of the Year.

White underwent Tommy John surgery immediately after participating in 2022 spring training, forcing him to miss the whole season. On November 15, 2022, the Rays selected his contract and added him to the 40-man roster. White was optioned to Triple-A Durham to begin the 2023 season.

Grant Witherspoon

Grant Lee Witherspoon (born September 27, 1996) is an American professional baseball outfielder in the Tampa Bay Rays organization.

Witherspoon attended D'Evelyn Junior/Senior High School in Denver, Colorado where he played baseball, basketball, and golf. As a senior in 2015, he batted .364 alongside pitching to a 1.19 ERA. He went unselected in the 2016 Major League Baseball draft and enrolled at Tulane University where he played three years of college baseball. In 2017, he played collegiate summer baseball with the Bourne Braves of the Cape Cod Baseball League. As a junior in 2018, he batted .330 with 12 home runs and 53 RBIs over 58 starts for Tulane. After the season, he was selected by the Tampa Bay Rays in the fourth round of the 2018 Major League Baseball draft.

Witherspoon signed with the Rays and made his professional debut with the Princeton Rays, batting .245 with five home runs and 31 RBIs over 56 games. He spent the 2019 season with the Bowling Green Hot Rods with whom he appeared in 119 games and hit .248 with ten home runs, 54 RBIs, and 22 stolen bases. He did not play a minor league game in 2020 due to the cancellation of the minor league season. He did, however, play for the Perth Heat of the Australian Baseball League that winter. Witherspoon returned to Bowling Green in 2021, slashing .269/.331/.503 with 22 home runs and seventy RBIs over 99 games. He opened the 2022 season with the Montgomery Biscuits and was promoted to the Durham Bulls in late June. Over 115 games, he slashed .266/.343/.467 with 17 home runs, 61 RBIs, and 15 stolen bases.

Tulane Green Wave bio

Full Triple-A to Rookie League rosters

Triple-A

Double-A

High-A

Single-A

Rookie

Foreign Rookie

References

Minor league players
Tampa